Charles Mulford Robinson (1869–1917) was a journalist and a writer who became famous as a pioneering urban planning theorist. He has the greatest influence as a missionary for urban beautification. He was the first Professor for Civic Design at University of Illinois at Urbana-Champaign, which was only one of two universities offering courses in urban planning at the time, the other being Harvard.

Robinson wrote "The Fair as a Spectacle" in 1893, an illustrated description of Chicago's World Columbian Exposition, a watershed event for the City Beautiful Movement, and went on to write the first guide to city planning in 1901, titled The Improvement of Towns and Cities.

In 1909, he developed the original plans for the Fort Wayne Park and Boulevard System in Fort Wayne, Indiana.  He was hired in 1910 to review the city design and planning of St. Joseph, Missouri. Fully half of his report dealt with the need for park space in the city, leading to the design of the National Register of Historic Places–listed St. Joseph Park and Parkway System.

Works
 
 
 1: Philanthropic Progress
 2: Educational Progress
 3: Aesthetic Progress
 Rochester Ways. Scrantom Wetmore & Company, Rochester, New York, 1900.
 The Improvement of Towns and Cities. Or the Practical Basic of Civic Aesthetics. Putnam's Sons, New York, 1901.
 Modern Civic Art, or the City Made Beautiful. G.P. Putnam's Sons, New York, 1903.
 The Call of the City. Paul Elder & Company, San Francisco/New York, 1908.
 City Planning. G.P. Putnam's Sons, New York, 1916.

References

 San Diego's City Park 1902-1910 From Parsons To Balboa
 PARKS AS ART INFLUENCES: An Interesting Book on the Improvement of Towns and Cities Renaissance of the Spirit of Civic Art is Beginning to Pervade the Municipalities (Review), Samuel Parsons, Jnr.
 Jon A. Peterson. The Birth of City Planning in the United States (Review), Daphne Spain

External links

 
 Finding aid to the  Charles Mulford Robinson papers at the University of Pennsylvania Libraries

Urban theorists
Burials at Mount Hope Cemetery (Rochester)
American architecture writers
American male non-fiction writers
University of Illinois Urbana-Champaign faculty
1869 births
1917 deaths
American urban planners